Tessiture Luigi Bevilacqua is a textile company incorporated in Venice in 1875—originally in the sestiere of Castello. The company deals primarily with the production of velvet, lampas, damask, and satin on 17th century looms.

History

Origins 

The first evidence of the involvement of the Bevilacqua family in the production of silks date back to 1499. It wasn't until 1875, however, that the textile production was incorporated into a company under Luigi Bevilacqua (1844–1898).

References

Textile companies of Italy
Companies based in Venice
Italian companies established in 1875
High fashion brands
Luxury brands